The Marehan is a Somali clan, which is part of one of the largest Somali clan families, the Darod. The clan is one of the largest constituent sub-clans of the Darod. The majority of the Marehan live in the Jubaland in southern Somalia, as well as the Galguduud and Mudug regions in central Somalia, the Somali region of Ethiopia and the North Eastern Province of Kenya.

Overview
One of the earliest mentions of this Somali clan may be by the Jesuit Jerónimo Lobo, who attempted to enter Ethiopia by way of the Jubba River in 1624. He learned of an ethnic group known as the Maracatos, whom C.F. Beckingham identifies as the Marehan, and whom Lobo located in the approximate location of the Somali clan.

Between the 17th and 18th centuries, the Marehan were reported to have lived in an area that extended from the Bandar Siyada on the Gulf of Aden to beyond Ras el-Khail on the Indian Ocean, or much of northern Somalia. The clan are recorded as having played a significant role in Imam Ahmad ibn Ibrihim al-Ghazi's campaigns against Ethiopia during the 16th century. The commander of the Somali forces and the closest deputy of the Imam was a Marehan commander, Garad Ahmed bin Hirabu. The Marehan along with the Habar Makadi/Makadur of the Gadabuursi; helped push westward the enemies into the plains of Harar and farther, helping destabilize the highland Christian empire. Evident in these battles were the Somali archers, namely the Marehan and the Gerri archers, through whom al-Ghazi was able to defeat the numerically superior Ethiopian Army that consisted of 16,000 cavalry and more than 200,000 infantry.

As early as 1650, the Marehan were reported to have lived in Jubaland.

Groups 
The Juba Valley Alliance is a political faction of the Somali Civil War.

The Somali Revolutionary Socialist Party was the ruling party of the Somali Democratic Republic from 1976 to 1991. 

The Somali National Front (SNF) was also a revolutionary movement and armed militia in Somalia After Somali Democratic Republic were clapsed.

Clan tree
There is no clear agreement on the clan and sub-clan structures and many lineages are omitted. The following listing is taken from the World Bank's Conflict in Somalia: Drivers and Dynamics from 2005 and the United Kingdom's Home Office publication, Somalia Assessment 2001.

In the Marehan clan-family, component clans are divided into two uterine divisions Marehan In Jubaland, Galgaduud and Mudug Somalia the World Bank shows the following clan tree: In the World Bank shows the following Marehan clan tree.
 
Awsame

Owrmidig

 Habar ciise

Baalyeri
Hodonbari
Hodonbari
Gaalshireedle
Gashashoor
Gaalshireedle
Xasan Gaalshireedle
isaaq Gaalshireedle
Amaanreer
Maxamed Amaanreer (Wagardhac)
Cali Amaanreer (Hawraarsame)
Talxe Amaanreer (Talxe)
Radamiir Amaanreer
Radamiir
 WarWaa'Jecle
WarWaa'Jecle
 Yacquub WarWaa'Jecle (Fiqi Yacquub)
 Ciise WarWaa'Jecle (Habar Ciise)
 Celi WarWaa'Jecle (Celi)
 Muuse WarWaa'Jecle
Muuse WarWaa'Jecle
 Abaadir Muuse
 Maamasame Muuse
Abaadir Muuse
 Daa'uud Abadir
 Soonfure Abaadir (Soonfure)
Daa'uud
 Boqor Maxamed Daa'uud
Boqor Maxamed Daa'uud
 Cali Maxamed (Cali Dheere)
 Cismaan Maxamed (Reer Cismaan)
 Yuusuf Maxamed (Reer Yuusuf)
 Axmed Maxamed
Axmed Maxamed
 Ciis
Ciis
 Mataan
Mataan
 Reer Garaad
 Hiraabe Mataan
 Yuusuf Mataan
Yuusuf mataan
 Nuur Yuusuf (Imam Nuur ibn Mujaahid) Ina Nur
 Xuseen Yuusuf
Xuseen Yuusuf
Bah Gareen
Siyaad Xuseen ( Reer Siyaad Xuseen )
Yabar Xuseen
Khalaf Xuseen
Bah Ismaacil
Axmed Xuseen ( Reer Axmed )
Cali Xuseen
Reer Siyaad Xuseen
 Reer Rooble Siyaad
 Reer Nuur Siyaad
 Reer Buraale
 Reer Saanyar
 Reer Faarax Siyaad
 Reer Tuur
 Reer Jimca Doon
 Reer Liiban Dalal
 Reer Cadaan
 Reer Qeyr
 Reer Odowaa
Khalaf Xuseen
Samatar Khalaf
Ugaas Sharmaarke Khalaf
Ugaas Sharmaarke
Bah Dir
Bah Abasguul
Ugaas Guuleed
Ugaas Guuleed 
Baho Guuleed
Faarax Ugaas
Faarax Ugaas
 Guleed Faarax
 Xersi Faarax
 Samantar Faarax
 Rooble Faarax
 Ugaas Diini Faarax (Reer Diini)
Ugaas Diini
Bah Ogaaden
 Reer Dalal
 Reer Xirsi
 Reer Maxmuud Guuled
Bah Dhulbahante
Reer Allamagan Diini
 Bah Xawaadle
 Reer Ugaas Sharmake
 Reer Siyaad
 Reer Warsame
Bah Daraandole
 Reer Kooshin
 Reer Nuur
 Reer Warfaa Diini
 Reer Shirwac Diini
 Reer Maxmuud Diini
 Reer Faarax Diini
 Reer Qaliif Diini ( Qaliif Gawracane )

Notable people 
 Mohamed Omar Salihi, Was a marine scientist, engineer, and maritime advisor to the Somali presidency credited for the protection of Somalia's maritime database during the civil war that broke in 1991.
 Abdiweli Sheikh Ahmed, 17th Prime Minister of Somalia, Economist and Politician. 
 Mohamed Abdullahi Farmaajo, 9th President of Somalia, Founder Nabad iyo Nolol party  

 Mohamed Siad Barre, Former President of Somali Democratic Republic.

 Mohamed Mohamoud Warsame (Jango’an) Former interior Minister of  Somalia.
 Abdiweli Sheikh Ahmed, Former Prime minister of Somalia.
 Mohamud Ali Magan, Former Minister of Planning, Former Consul General to United States Of America and Canada.
 Abdi Farah Shirdon, Former Prime Minister of Somalia.
 Mohamed Ali, Is director for the Kismayo Regional Islamic Courts under the government of the Juba Valley Alliance.
 Abdiwahid Gonjeh, Former Prime Minister of Somalia.
 Abdirahman Jama Barre, The first Deputy Prime Minister.
 Shire Jama Ahmed, a linguist who implemented the modern Somali Latin script.
General Yusuf Osman Dhumal, a former Head Commander of Somali Military Forces.
Farah Hussein Sharmarke, a philosopher and poet.
Omar Haji Massale, Former Minister of Defence and Health of Somalia
Ahmed Abdullahi Gulleid, A columnist, writer and researcher.
Mohamed Hashi Abdi, Former Vice President of the Galmudug State.
Dr. Mohamed Said Samatar, Somali Architects and Strategist Designer, Founder of the Somali National Front.
Emir Nur ibn Mujahid, the second conqueror of Ethiopia and the Patron Saint of Harar was one of rulers of parts of the Horn of Africa.
Fatimo Isaak Bihi, First Somali female Ambassador to Geneva, Director of the African Department of the Ministry of Foreign Affairs.
Khalif Farah Hayir, a poet who mainly creates patriotic poems as well as poems that address Somali social issues.
Ahmed Warsame, Former Head of the Somali Military Academy.
Aden Ibrahim Aw Hirsi, An author and politician – helped with planning of the Jubaland State and the current Minister of State for Environment & Climate Change of Somalia.
Abdullahi Anod, Former Head Commander of the Somali Military Forces.
Colonel Barre Adan Shire Hiiraale, Former Minister of Defence of Somalia, head of the Jubba Valley Alliance.
Abdulkadir Sheikh Dini, Former Minister of Defence of Somalia.
Abdi Shire Warsame, Former Somali Ambassador to Kenya and China and a former Foreign Affairs State Minister in the Transitional National Government.
Abdulahi Sheik Ismael Fara-Tag, Member of sen of upper house in Somalia, Former Vice President Of Jubaland State of Somalia   Former head of the Juba Valley Alliance.
Ahmed Mohamed Hassan, A member of the Pan-African Parliament.
General Dr. Ali Nur.
General Mohammed Hashi ''Gaani'', a former Head Commander of the Somali Military Forces as well as being the former head of the SNF.
Garad Ahmed bin Hirabu.
Ahmed 'Idaaja'' Farah Ali, a Somali literary scholar and publisher of written folklore.
Mohamed Aden Sheikh, Premier Somali intellectual, Former head of Somali Technological Development, Medical doctor and Former Ministry of Health, Education and Information, Former Head of the Ideology Bureau SRRC.
Abdulkadir 'Yamyam'' Hersi Siyad was a Somali poet and playwright.
 Ali Matan Hashi, First Somali pilot and Commander of the  Somali Air Force between 1959 to 1978.
 Ahmed Sheikh Ali Ahmed. Author, Former President of Court of Appeal, Somali Democratic Republic.

References

Sources
 

Darod
Somali clans
Somali clans in Ethiopia